The Madhya Pradesh School of Drama or MPSD, is a theatre training institute situated at Bhopal, India. It is an autonomous organization under Ministry of Culture, Government of India. It was set up in 2011 by the cabinet of Madhya Pradesh.

The drama school  established by government of MP  for the practice of systematic training, ultra modern aspects of performances, documentation, maintain a museum, research, library works of traditional, classical and modern theater under the guidance of many eminent theater personalities in the country.

Training methods 
Comprehensive knowledge of different aspects of theater training and practice which also includes a host of traditional theater forms such as classical theater, folk and tribal traditions particularly famous local theaters of Madhya Pradesh.

Guest lecturers 
Several theatre and  film personalities visit the Madhya Pradesh School of Drama as guest lecturers for master classes. Indian theatre directors and actors like Raghubir Yadav, Om Puri, Govind Namdev, Atul Tiwari, Piyush Mishra, Uttara Baokar, Alok Chatterjee have conducted Workshops and interactive session at the Drama school.

See also 
 Theatre of India
 Ebrahim Alkazi
 Bhartendu Natya Academy
 Biju Pattnaik Film and Television Institute of Odisha
 Government Film and Television Institute
 Film and Television Institute of India
 Satyajit Ray Film and Television Institute
 State Institute of Film and Television
 National School of Drama

References

External links 

Drama schools in India
Performing arts education in India
Culture of Bhopal
Organisations based in Bhopal
2011 establishments in Madhya Pradesh
Educational institutions established in 2011
Arts organizations established in 2011